I'm American is the twelfth studio album released by American country music singer Billy Ray Cyrus.

The album, released on June 28, 2011, is composed of patriotic songs, including a re-recording of Cyrus' song "Some Gave All", which originally appeared on his debut album of the same name. The re-recording features vocals from country music singers Darryl Worley, Craig Morgan, and Jamey Johnson. It was intended on being released as the album's first single, however, in 2011, the single was changed to "Runway Lights". The second single, "Nineteen", was released on September 26, 2011.

Background
I'm American was initially scheduled to be released in November 2010. After being pushed back numerous times, it was released on June 28, 2011. In early 2011, a re-recording of "Some Gave All" was planned to be the first single released from the album. The song, which features vocals from singers Darryl Worley, Craig Morgan, and Jamey Johnson, was pulled from radio and replaced with "Runway Lights". The latter song was released as the lead-off single from the album. "Runway Lights" is also the theme song to Cyrus' new show, Surprise Homecoming, which debuted on TLC, May 30, 2011.

On May 12, 2011, Cyrus announced via The Boot that he was planning on retiring from recording after releasing I'm American, but he stated that he would continue to perform live because he "loves playing in a band." However he wrote numerous songs surrounding issues with the separation and reconciliation with his wife, and wants to record those for one final album.

Reception

Commercial
I'm American debuted at number 153 on the US Billboard 200 and number 24 on the US Billboard Top Country Albums, with first week sales of 3,797 copies. The album's first single, Runway Lights", failed to enter the US Billboard Hot Country Songs chart. However, the second single, "Nineteen", debuted on the country chart at number 58 for the week ending October 8, 2011. It is Cyrus' first charted single since "A Good Day" peaked at number 59 on the country chart in September 2009.

Critical

Stephen Thomas Erlewine of Allmusic gave the album a three-out-of-five star rating. Erlewine said that Cyrus "sounds like a ruminative, mumbling Bruce Springsteen, so Billy Ray muscularly strums his guitar while rhapsodizing about the downtrodden working class." He also went on to say that I'm American is more relaxed than Cyrus' album Home at Last, by saying it is sincere in Cyrus' singing and what he's singing about. He finished his review by saying I'm American is "more engaging than his last few attempts to make country-pop that appeals to everybody".

Billy Dukes from Taste of Country reviewed the album positively, giving it three-and-half stars out of five. Dukes praised Cyrus' patriotism, and packing every song on the album with plenty of emotion. He goes on to describe "Nineteen" and "We Fought Hard" as songs of soldiers who didn't make it home from war, and noted they are predictable, powerful ballads that may leave some needing a tissue. Dukes also commented on the re-recording of "Some Gave All", saying that it was not any better or worse than the original. He closed by saying Cyrus gives a great effort, as he does with everything he touches.

Track listing

Personnel

 Bob Bailey – background vocals
 Bucky Baxter – steel guitar
 Wyatt Beard – background vocals
 Pat Buchanan – electric guitar
 Buddy Cannon – background vocals
 Melonie Cannon – background vocals
 Butch Carr – synthesizer
 J.T. Corenflos – electric guitar
 Billy Ray Cyrus – lead vocals, background vocals
 Chip Davis – background vocals
 Amy Grant – vocals on "Stripes and Stars"
 Kenny Greenberg – electric guitar
 Wes Hightower – background vocals
 Jamey Johnson – vocals on "Some Gave All"
 Paul Leim – drums
 Randy McCormick – Hammond B-3 organ, piano, synthesizer
 Craig Morgan – vocals on "Some Gave All"
 Larry Paxton – bass guitar
 Gary Prim – Hammond B-3 organ, piano
 Angela Primm – background vocals
 Mickey Raphael – harmonica
 Deanie Richardson – fiddle
 Scott Vestal – banjo
 Gale Mayes-West – background vocals
 John Willis – banjo, acoustic guitar
 Darryl Worley – vocals on "Some Gave All"

Chart performance

Album

Singles

References

2011 albums
Billy Ray Cyrus albums
Buena Vista Records albums
Albums produced by Buddy Cannon